
Gmina Dąbrowa is a rural gmina (administrative district) in Opole County, Opole Voivodeship, in south-western Poland.

The gmina contains part of the protected area called Stobrawa Landscape Park.

Villages
Gmina Dąbrowa contains the villages and settlements of Chróścina, Ciepielowice, Dąbrowa, Karczów, Lipowa, Mechnice, Narok, Prądy, Siedliska, Skarbiszów, Sławice, Sokolniki, Wrzoski, Wyrębiny and Żelazna.

Neighbouring gminas
Gmina Dąbrowa is bordered by the city of Opole and by the gminas of Dobrzeń Wielki, Komprachcice, Lewin Brzeski, Niemodlin, Popielów and Tułowice.

Twin towns – sister cities

Gmina Dąbrowa is twinned with:
 Dąbrowa, Poland
 Halych, Ukraine
 Lengede, Germany
 Oravské Veselé, Slovakia

References

Dabrowa
Opole County